Fox Sports is a group of channels available in Argentina and operated by Mediapro. The network is focused on sports-related programming including live and pre-recorded event broadcasts, sports talk shows and original programming, available throughout Argentina. The network is based in Argentina. The channel's name and various programs are licensed from Fox Sports Media Group, a subsidiary of Fox Corporation.

History

The network was launched in 1996 as Prime Deportiva, under the ownership of Liberty Media. Prior to its launch, on October 31, 1995, News Corporation acquired a 50% ownership interest in Liberty's Prime Network group and its international networks (including sister channels Premier Sports and Prime Sports Asia) as part of an expansion of its Fox Sports properties in the Americas. In 1996, the channel was rebranded as Fox Sports Américas, later shortened to Fox Sports in 1999. In 2002, Hicks, Muse, Tate and Furst, a Dallas private equity firm, Liberty Media Corp and News Corp created a holding company (Fox Pan American Sports) to jointly operate FOX Sports Latin America. News Corp owned approximately 38% interest. Liberty later exited leaving HMTF and News Corp as co-owners of the cable network. News Corp purchased the ownership rights from HMTF of FOX Sports en Espanol and rebranded as FOX Deportes in 2010. News Corp purchased the remaining ownership rights for the holding company from HMTF and fully owned the FOX Sports Latin America cable network in 2011.

In 2009, a second feed called Fox Sports+ (FOX Sports mas) was launched, to allow simultaneous broadcasting of football. In 2010, FOX Sports signed a deal with UFC to be the first cable network to show it in Latin America. FOX Sports also opened a studio in 2010 in Mexico City where it broadcasts original programming and licensed programming. In 2012, the channel was renamed to Fox Sports 2, whereas Speed Channel was rebranded to Fox Sports 3.

On August 21, 2017, Fox launched a new channel called Fox Sports Premium that broadcast the replays of the matches of the Argentine Primera División until August 25, 2017, when the Superliga Argentina began an agreement with TNT Sports to share the directives of Argentine football.

On October 16, 2020, the Argentine Football Association would breach their television contract to broadcast Argentinian football on Fox Sports due to the Disney acquisition of 21st Century Fox, with TNT Sports being the only broadcasters leaving open the possibility that the Televisión Pública of reacquiring the rights. However, on October 30 the Argentinian court would rule in favor of Fox, with Fox being able to broadcast the matches.

On January 29, 2021, Disney would reach in agreement with Argentine Football Association to broadcast Argentine Primeira Division matches until 2030 with its sister channel ESPN to also broadcast outside of Argentina with Televisión Pública broadcasting matches in Argentina.

In November 2021, Disney announced that Fox Sports' main channel would be renamed ESPN 4 except in Argentina on December 1, 2021.  Fox Sports 2, Fox Sports 3 and Fox Sports Premium would continue on the air in Argentina.

On January 20, 2022, CNDC ordered Disney to divest the Fox Sports television network from the 21st Century Fox purchase in order to get an approval from the government of Argentina.
 
On February 15, 2022, Disney announced it would sell Fox Sports Argentina to Mediapro. The sale was approved by the CNDC on April 27, 2022.

It was announced that on May 1, 2022, Fox Sports Premium would rebrand to ESPN Premium.

Programming
Fox Sports Argentina broadcasts sports-related programming 24 hours a day in Spanish. The network carries a wide variety of sports events, including football (Copa Libertadores, Argentine Primeira Division etc.), and WWE programming. Fox Sports also aired talk shows (NET: Nunca es tarde) as well as other programming including exercise programs.

Sports programming

Football
 UEFA Champions League
 UEFA Super Cup
 Scottish Premiership
 Belgian Pro League
 Süper Lig
 Brasileirão

Other sports
 Formula One
 Porsche Cup
 Liga ACB
 Copa del Rey de Baloncesto
 Supercopa Endesa
 Córdoba Open
 Rally Argentino
 World Rugby Sevens Series
 Premier Boxing Champions (Except PPV main card)
 Ultimate Fighting Championship (Except PPV main card)
 Major League Baseball
 National Football League
 WWE (Raw, SmackDown, Main Event, NXT and Vintage)

Other programming
Alongside its live sports broadcasts, Fox Sports also airs a variety of sports highlight, talk, and documentary styled shows. These include:

Personalities 

Former (prior to closing of acquisition by Disney in March 2020):

  Alejandro Ruzal
  Agostina Larocca
  Federico Bulos
  Fernando Niembro
  Gustavo López
  Gonzalo Cardozo
  Guillermo Poggi
  Gustavo Yarroch
  Damián Trillini
  Daniel Retamozo
  Diego "Chavo" Fucks
  Diego Latorre
  Diego Monroig
  Esteban Edul
  Juan Manuel "Bambino" Pons
  Juan Carlos Pellegrini
  Julián Fernández 
  Jorge Baravalle
  Jorge Barril
  Javier Tabares
  Leandro Alves
  Leonardo Gentili
  Leonardo Gabés
  Mateo Ferrer
  Marcelo Benedetto
  Martín Ponte
  Matías Sánchez
  Mauricio Gallardo "Damon"
  Nicolás Brusco
  Pablo Pons 
  Pablo Schillaci
  Pablo Paván
  Raúl Barceló
  Renato Della Paolera
  Sebastián Porto
  Sebastián "Pollo" Vignolo
  Santiago Russo
  Tomás Dávila

See also
 Fox Sports International
 Fox Sports (Brazil)
 Fox Sports (Mexico)
 Fox Sports (Latin America)
 GOL TV 
 ESPN Latin America
 TyC Sports
 DirecTV Sports 
 Claro Sports

References

External links
 

Latin American cable television networks
Television networks in Argentina
Argentina
Television channels and stations established in 1996
Spanish-language television stations
Television stations in Argentina
Broadcasting in Argentina
Prime Sports